Perino may refer to:

 Perino Model 1908, an early Italian machine gun
 Perino del Vaga (nickname of Piero Bonaccorsi; 1501–1547), Italian painter and draughtsman
 Perino's, a former restaurant in Los Angeles, California
 Perino (surname), an Italian surname

See also

 Perinone, a class of organic compounds
 Pierino (disambiguation)